Orlando is an unincorporated community in Rockcastle County, Kentucky, United States. It is located at the junction of Kentucky Route 1004 and Kentucky Route 1912.

References

Unincorporated communities in Rockcastle County, Kentucky
Unincorporated communities in Kentucky